Jung Hyung-don (born February 7, 1978) is a South Korean comedian and television host. He is best known for his roles on the variety shows Infinite Challenge and Weekly Idol.

Early life and education
Jung was born in Gimcheon in North Gyeongsang Province, South Korea. As a child, he moved with his family to Busan, where he later attended Busan Electronic Technical High School. After graduation, he worked for Samsung Electronics in Suwon for six years before entering the entertainment industry.

Career
Jung made his television debut on the sketch comedy show Gag Concert in 2002. On the show, he performed a sketch called "Do-Re-Mi Trio," in which he and two other comedians sang excerpts of popular songs, adding comedic punch lines to the end.

In 2005, Jung joined the cast of a new variety show called Infinite Challenge. Though the show initially had low viewership ratings, it went on to be a hit, and several of the songs Jung recorded for the show's periodic "song festivals" charted in the top ten of South Korea's music charts.

Jung joined the cast of the first season of the marriage simulation show We Got Married in 2008. He was initially paired with television personality Saori until her departure from the show. He was later paired with singer Taeyeon of Girls' Generation. The match caused an uproar from Girls' Generation fans, in part due to the 11-year age gap between the two entertainers.

In 2011, Jung and rapper Defconn became co-hosts of the new idol-focused reality show Weekly Idol.

Hiatus
In November 2015, Jung's agency, FNC Entertainment, announced that he was taking a break from all activities due to his anxiety disorder. At the time, he was a cast member or host on several television shows, including Infinite Challenge, Weekly Idol, and Please Take Care of My Refrigerator. Jung officially left the cast of Infinite Challenge in July 2016.

Return
Jung returned as the co-host of Weekly Idol in October 2016, ending his 11-month break from television activities. In March 2018, both Jung and Defconn left Weekly Idol. In May, they became hosts of the variety show Idol Room.

Second hiatus
On November 5, 2020, it was announced by Jung's agency FNC Entertainment that he will take another break from all activities due to anxiety disorder relapse. In October 2021, Jung decided not to renew his contract with FNC Entertainment.

On November 15, 2021, Jung founded the Matched Project (MCP) agency with Kim Young-man, Kim Sung-joo, and Ahn Jung-hwan.

Personal life
Jung married comedy writer Han Yu-ra on September 13, 2009. They have two children, twin daughters, who were born on December 11, 2012.

Television appearances

Current programs

Former programs

Drama
 Rollercoaster (재밌는TV 롤러코스터, 2009~) Leading actor with Jeong Ga-eun

Discography

Singles

Awards

References

External links
 Jung Hyung-don at FNC Entertainment 

Infinite Challenge members
South Korean Buddhists
South Korean television presenters
South Korean male comedians
People from Busan
People from Gimcheon
1978 births
FNC Entertainment artists
Living people
Gag Concert
Weekly Idol members